NGC 2022 is a planetary nebula in the equatorial constellation of Orion, located at a distance of  from the Sun. It was first observed by William Herschel on December 28, 1785, who described it as: considerably bright, nearly round, like a star with a large diameter, like an ill-defined planetary nebula. In medium-sized amateur telescopes it looks like a small grayish patch of light. It is not very bright but it is still easy to spot it in the eyepiece. Even in a telescope as small as 80mm it can just be seen using a narrowband filter such as an OIII filter as a 'fuzzy' star.

This is a double-shell planetary nebula with a wind-compressed inner shell and a more nebulous second shell. The second shell is nearly circular and is expanding more slowly than the inner. A faint outer halo consists of the remains of material ejected during the central star's asymptotic giant branch stage. 

NGC 2022 lies 11° away from the Galactic Plane, which position suggests it was formed from a low-mass star. The elemental abundances are similar to those in the Sun, although carbon is about 50% higher and sulfur is a factor of two lower.

Gallery

References

External links
 

Planetary nebulae
2022
Orion (constellation)